Roger Ballard (born in Kentwood, Louisiana) is an American country music singer-songwriter. His first single was "A Cheap Imitation of You" on the Swamp Pop label in 1990.

Ballard was signed to Atlantic Records, who released his debut album, A Little Piece of Heaven, on September 21, 1993. His single "Two Steps in the Right Direction" peaked at number 68 on the Billboard Hot Country Singles & Tracks chart. Larry Flick of Billboard called the song "a western swing therapy session."

Ballard is now the emcee of Dolly Parton's Stampede in Pigeon Forge, TN, hosting hundreds of shows a year.

A Little Piece of Heaven (1993)

Track listing

Singles

Music videos

References

American country singer-songwriters
American male singer-songwriters
Living people
Country musicians from Louisiana
People from Kentwood, Louisiana
Atlantic Records artists
Singer-songwriters from Louisiana
Year of birth missing (living people)